Rîșcani (also spelled Râșcani) is a city in Moldova, the capital of the Rîșcani District. It is located along the Copăceanca river, about 22 kilometres from the station in Drochia. Two villages are administered by the city, Bălanul Nou and Rămăzan.

History
During the interwar period, the city was the seat of Plasa Râșcani, in Bălți County, Romania. 

A number of Bessarabian Germans lived in the village from its founding in 1865, who called it Ryschkanowka.  The German population was forcibly removed in 1940; among the Germans expelled from Rîșcani were the parents of later German president Horst Köhler.

In the USSR era, Rîșcani was home to a number of factories, a state agrotechnic school, and tobacco farms. In January 2011, the population was 14,400.

International relations

Twin Towns - Sister Cities
Rîșcani is twinned with:

  Năvodari, Romania
Planned partner city relations:
  Tököl, Hungary

References

 Rîșcani Stadium

Cities and towns in Moldova
Beletsky Uyezd
Bălți County (Romania)
Rîșcani District